The Men's Foil event of the 2013 World Combat Games was held  in Saint Petersburg, Russia on 26 October.

Medalists

Athlete List

 Maximilien Van Haaster
 Ma Jianfei
 Erwann Le Péchoux
 Richard Kruse
 Peter Joppich
 Alaaeldin Abouelkassem
 James-Andrew Davis
 Andrea Cassarà
 Andrea Baldini
 Heo Jun
 Cheung Siu Lun
 Artur Akhmatkhuzin
 Aleksey Cheremisinov
 Rostyslav Hertsyk
 Miles Chamley-Watson
 Race Imboden

Results

References
Bracket

Fencing at the 2013 World Combat Games